John James Kennedy Jr. (born 22 November 1959) is a former Australian rules footballer, the son of former Hawthorn footballer, coach John Kennedy Sr. and the father of Josh Kennedy, who plays for the Sydney Swans.

Kennedy was a four-time premiership player for Hawthorn. In 1993, Kennedy was appointed as assistant coach to Peter Knights at the Hawks. In 1995, Kennedy was elected to the board of directors of the Hawthorn Football Club. He is no longer a member.

Kennedy played a total of 241 games for Hawthorn, placing him 11th in the list of the most club matches in Hawthorn history at the end of the 2005 season.

Kennedy is also of an Italian descent through his maternal grandparents.

References

External links

1959 births
Hawthorn Football Club players
Hawthorn Football Club Premiership players
Hawthorn Football Club administrators
De La Salle OC Amateur Football Club players
Australian rules footballers from Victoria (Australia)
Living people
Victorian State of Origin players
Australian people of Irish descent
Australian people of Italian descent
Sportspeople of Italian descent
Four-time VFL/AFL Premiership players